George Pratt (born October 13, 1960) is an  American painter and illustrator known for his work in the comic book field.

Biography
In 1980, at the age of 19, George Pratt left his native Beaumont, Texas, and moved to New York City to study drawing and painting at the Pratt Institute.

Comics

Pratt's first published comics work was for Marvel Comics' Epic Illustrated #20 (1983). Since then, his work has appeared in Heavy Metal, Eagle, and many other publications. He has also inked other artists' work and created painted covers for DC Comics.

In 1990, DC published Pratt's first graphic novel, Enemy Ace: War Idyll, which was nominated for both the Eisner Award and the Harvey Award. Enemy Ace: War Idyll has been translated into nine languages and at one point was on the required reading list at West Point. The book won the France Info Award for Best Foreign Language Graphic Novel, and the British Speakeasy Award for Best Foreign Language Graphic Novel.

Pratt's painted graphic novel Batman: Harvest Breed (DC) was nominated for two Eisner Awards.

The Wolverine: Netsuke limited series for Marvel won Pratt the 2003 Eisner Award for Best Painter/Multimedia Artist.

As of the late 2000s, Pratt is working on the book See You in Hell, Blind Boy: A Tales of the Blues, based on his research of the Mississippi Delta. With Steven Budlong and James McGillion, Pratt made a documentary film about his Mississippi travels, also called See You in Hell, Blind Boy. The film won Best Feature Documentary at the 1999 New York International Independent Film & Video Festival.

Illustrations
Pratt has done cover and interior illustrations for books published by Bantam Books, Henry Holt, Warner Books, Mojo Press, and Random House, among others.

Pratt has exhibited his work many times at the Society of Illustrators, and is featured in the Society's compendium The Illustrator In America: 1860-2000 (written by Walter Reed).

Pratt has illustrated cards for the Magic: The Gathering collectible card game.

Teaching
Pratt taught for seven years at the Pratt Institute. He has also taught painting and illustration at the Joe Kubert School of Cartoon and Graphic Art, the School of Visual Arts, the Savannah College of Art & Design, Virginia Commonwealth University, and currently at Ringling College of Art and Design. At Virginia Commonwealth University, he taught the artist and illustrator, Gian Galang.

Bibliography
 Enemy Ace: War Idyll (DC, 1990) 
 No Man's Land: A Postwar Sketchbook of the War in the Trenches (Tundra Press, 1992) 
 Batman: Harvest Breed (DC, 2003) 
 The Haunted Tank (written by Brian Azzarello)

Notes

References

 Pratt bio at Lambiek.net's Comiclopedia

External links
 
 Pratt page with art samples at Allen Spiegel Fine Arts 
Young, Robert. "George Pratt Interview excerpt from The Comics Interpreter #2"
 
 Solinas, Antonio. "Turpentine and Guns: The World of George Pratt," Comics Code.
  Hurtz, Jeremy. "Chapel Hill's Hidden Comic Genius," Daily Tar Heel (Feb. 2, 2001).

1960 births
20th-century American painters
21st-century American painters
21st-century American male artists
American comics artists
American illustrators
American male painters
Comics inkers
Eisner Award winners for Best Painter/Multimedia Artist (Interior)
Game artists
Living people
People from Beaumont, Texas
People from Chapel Hill, North Carolina
People from Houston
Pratt Institute alumni
Artists from Texas
Artists from North Carolina
20th-century American male artists